Pop song is the main form of pop music.

Pop Song or Pop Songs may refer to:

Music
 Mainstream Top 40, a music chart published weekly by Billboard magazine, known as "Pop Songs" on billboard.com
 "Pop Song" (David Sylvian song)
 "Pop Song" (The Drugs song)
 "Pop Song 89", song by R.E.M.
 "Pop Song", song by STRFKR from the album Starfucker
 "Pop Song", a song by Clouddead from the album Ten
 Pop Songs, 1997 greatest hits compilation by Iggy Pop

See also
"Pop" (song), 2001 song by NSYNC
Pop, Songs & Death, a series of EPs released by Wheatus
SongPop, 2012 music trivia game by FreshPlanet